Lucy Herbert, Countess of Powis (25 September 1793 – 16 September 1875), formerly Lady Lucy Graham, was the wife of Edward Herbert, 2nd Earl of Powis.

Lady Lucy was the daughter of James Graham, 3rd Duke of Montrose, and his wife, the former Lady Caroline Maria Montagu. She married the earl, then Edward Herbert, MP, heir to the earldom, on 9 February 1818. He succeeded to the earldom in 1839, at which point Lucy became Countess of Powis.

The couple had seven children:

Unnamed daughter Herbert 
Edward James Herbert, 3rd Earl of Powis (1818–1891)
Lady Lucy Caroline Herbert (c.1819–1884), who married Frederick Calvert and had no children
Lady Charlotte Elizabeth Herbert (1821–1906), who married Hugh Montgomery and had children
Lt.-Gen. Rt. Hon. Sir Percy Egerton Herbert (1822–1876), who married Lady Mary Caroline Louisa Thomas Petty-FitzMaurice and had children
Very Rev. Hon. George Herbert (1825–1894), Dean of Hereford, who married Elizabeth Beatrice Sykes and had children
Hon. Robert Charles Herbert (1827–1902), who married Anna Maria Cludde and had children
Maj.-Gen. William Henry Herbert (1834–1909), who married Sybella Augusta Milbank and had children.

The Earl of Powis died on 17 January 1848 at his home in Powis Castle after being accidentally shot during a pheasant hunt by one of his sons, the Hon. Robert Charles Herbert, ten days earlier. He was buried at St Mary's Parish Church, Welshpool. The countess herself died in 1875 at Walcot, Shropshire, where the family had another home.

A portrait of the countess, at around the time of her marriage, was painted by Frederick Richard Say and is held at Powis Castle.

A mineral collection donated to the National Museum of Wales in 1929 by George Charles Herbert, 4th Earl of Powis, Lucy's grandson, was for a time thought to have belonged to her, but was actually the collection made by her predecessor as Countess of Powis, Henrietta Clive.

Arms

References

1793 births
1875 deaths
British countesses
Daughters of British dukes